Nymphicula tariensis is a moth in the family Crambidae. It was described by David John Lawrence Agassiz in 2014. It is found in Papua New Guinea.

The wingspan is 12–13 mm. The base of the forewings is fuscous, mixed with ochreous. The subbasal fascia is white, suffused with ochreous towards the edge and the antemedian fascia is brown, edged with whitish. The median area is scaled with dark brown. The base of the hindwings is fuscous and the subbasal fascia is white. The antemedian fascia is fuscous.

Etymology
The species name refers to Tari, the type locality.

References

Nymphicula
Moths described in 2014